National Library of the Democratic Republic of Congo is located in Kinshasa and was established in 1974 as an office within Ministry of Culture and Arts. In 1989, it became autonomous under presidential order.

In 2009, the Library received a $15 million initiative from the Model United Nations of the University of Chicago and UNESCO to modernize facilities, train staff members and purchase new technology and materials. Although the library contains over seven thousand historical photographs of the political and cultural history of the country, only 25% have been scanned due to a lack of resources.

See also

References

Bibliography
  

Libraries in the Democratic Republic of the Congo
congo
Buildings and structures in Kinshasa
Education in Kinshasa
1970s establishments in Zaire
Libraries established in 1974